The 1972 Nippon Professional Baseball season was the 23rd season of operation of Nippon Professional Baseball (NPB).

Regular season standings

Japan Series

Yomiuri Giants won the series 4-1.

References